The 1982 Yugoslavian motorcycle Grand Prix was the eighth round of the 1982 Grand Prix motorcycle racing season. It took place on the weekend of 16–18 July 1982 at the Autodrom Rijeka.

Classification

500 cc

References

Yugoslav motorcycle Grand Prix
Yugoslavian
Motorcycle Grand Prix
Yugoslavian motorcycle Grand Prix